Balboa High School may refer to:

Balboa High School (Balboa, Virginia) in Balboa, Virginia
Balboa High School (Panama), a public high school in the former Panama Canal Zone, closed 1999
Balboa High School (San Francisco, California) in San Francisco, California